Lambu Nagesh (died September 1, 2017) was a Kannada actor who appeared in many films, television shows, and plays.

Career 
Lambu Nagesh started his career in the arts as an actor in plays, working with B. Jayashree. After that, he started acting in television shows, which is when he started to gain popularity. Nagesh acted in his first film, Prithviraj, in 1992. From then to his death, he acted in many films and TV series, mostly playing supporting roles and villain characters. Many of the films and TV shows he acted in were very well known throughout the country.

Filmography 
Lambu Nagesh acted in around 100 films. They include:

Death 
In late October 2017, Nagesh developed a liver disorder, and was taken to the MS Ramaiah Hospital for treatment. Five days later, on September 1, he died. Nagesh's family allowed his fans to pay tribute to him after his death.

References 

Year of birth missing
2017 deaths
Male actors in Kannada cinema
Male actors in Kannada television
Indian male film actors
Indian male television actors
Indian male stage actors